John P. Walters (born February 8, 1952) is the president and chief executive officer of Hudson Institute. He was appointed in January 2021. He joined Hudson in 2009 as the executive vice president and most recently was the chief operating officer. Previously, Walters was Director of the White House Office of National Drug Control Policy (ONDCP) in the George W. Bush administration. He held that position from December 7, 2001 to January 20, 2009. As the U.S. "Drug Czar", Walters coordinated all aspects of federal anti-drug policies and spending. As drug czar, he was a staunch opponent of drug decriminalization, legalization, and medical marijuana.

Background
He was Assistant to the Secretary at the U.S. Department of Education in the Reagan Administration. He was the Secretary's representative to the National Drug Policy Board and the Domestic Policy Council's Health Policy Working Group. From 1989 to 1991, Walters was chief of staff for William Bennett and was Deputy Director for Supply Reduction from 1991 until leaving the office in 1993.

Walters served as Acting Assistant Director and Program Officer in the Division of Education Programs at the National Endowment for the Humanities from 1982 to 1985. He has previously taught political science at Michigan State University's James Madison College and at Boston College. From 1996 until 2001 he served as president of the Philanthropy Roundtable.

He holds a BA from Michigan State University's James Madison College and a MA from the University of Toronto.

Policy views
Walters is opposed to the decriminalization and legalization of narcotics. Speaking of marijuana legalization in Colorado, he said, "My argument is look to Colorado: it’s getting worse. That’s exactly what they said they were going to do. Tax it; regulate it; we’re going to keep it away from kids; higher rate. I visited people shortly after the legalization in Denver. I was struck by a woman who said, 'I’m terrified for my children. We now are told our children cannot bring food or beverages to school.' Anything they consume in the school must be made under school supervision because, of course, you have brownies, fruit juices, candies, other kinds of things that are infused with cannabis or THC and can be used to poison these children."

Walters is a supporter of drug rehabilitation in place of incarceration to help drug users. In an interview, he said, "When I was in office, the criminal-justice system was the single largest category of institutions referring people to treatment using drug courts and diversion programs. Don’t send them to prison. Let’s get them into treatment because that’s what’s really causing their lives to be so self-destructive to themselves and to others. And it was that law and it was that effort."

References

External links
 Office of National Drug Control Policy
 University of Michigan, Survey Research Center Monitoring the Future, 2004 
 
 6 September 1990 rare video of "National Public Radio's Morning Edition" at 01:40:06 of John P. Walters and opposing views by Arnold Trebach of the Drug Policy Foundation about the "War on Drugs."
 Information on the New Citizenship Project

|-

1952 births
21st-century American politicians
Directors of the Office of National Drug Control Policy
George W. Bush administration cabinet members
Living people
Michigan Republicans
Michigan State University alumni
University of Toronto alumni
Hudson Institute